Club Sportiv Municipal Târgoviște, commonly referred to as simply CSM Târgoviște, is a Romanian women's basketball club from Târgoviște. Founded in 1991, it plays in the Liga Națională.

History

The club promoted to the first league in 1992. Târgoviște won its first national championship in 1995 and since then the team has won nine more championships. In 2010 it reached the Eurocup's Quarter-finals after beating MBK Ružomberok and CB Islas Canarias in the knockout stages, ending the competition after losing dramatically to Dynamo Kursk (75-57 and 55-76).

The club has gone through several name changes during its existence, including Oțelinox, Livas Metaco, Oțelul Livas, Livas, Livas Petrom, Biandra, Municipal, MCM Târgoviște, BC Municipal MCM and currently CSM Târgoviște.

Honours
 Liga Națională
Winners (12): 1994–95, 1995–96, 2001–02, 2002–03, 2003–04, 2004–05, 2006–07, 2008–09, 2009–10, 2011–12, 2013–14, 2014–15
Runners-up (3): 2005–06, 2012–13, 2015–16
 Cupa României
Winners (9): 2002–03, 2003–04, 2004–05, 2006–07, 2008–09, 2009–10, 2011–12, 2012–13, 2016–17
 Liga I
Winners (1): 1991–92

Notable players

References

External links
Eurobasket 
FIBA Europe profile

Târgoviște
Basketball teams in Romania
Women's basketball teams in Romania
Basketball teams established in 1991
1991 establishments in Romania